The Ministry of Finance (MOF; ;) is a ministry of the Government of Singapore responsible for managing the fiscal policies and the structure of the economy of Singapore.

Responsibilities 

The authority's main regulatory statutes are Accountants Act, Accounting Standards Partnerships Act, Business Registration Act, Companies Act, Limited Partnerships Act and the Limited Liability Partnerships Act.

The MOF ensures that businesses in Singapore are compatible with international standards and practices, in areas such as company law, accounting standards and corporate governance principles.

Singapore Budget

Every year, the MOF prepares the Singapore Budget and the Minister for Finance presents the Budget to the Parliament before the new financial year begins. The Budget includes the revised Government revenue and expenditure projections for the current financial year as well as the planned government revenue and expenditures for the following financial year.

Following the delivery of the Budget Statement in Parliament, Members of Parliament will debate on the statement and the proposed Budget for the following financial year. After the debate, the Parliament passes the Supply Bill and the President's assent will then be sought to allow the Bill to come into effect. Once the President gives its assent to the Supply Bill, it is then enacted as law known as the Supply Act. The Supply Act controls the Government's spending in the following financial year.

Organisational structure
The MOF oversees 4 statutory boards, which are the Accounting and Corporate Regulatory Authority (ACRA), Inland Revenue Authority of Singapore (IRAS), Singapore Accountancy Commission (SAC) and Tote Board. It also had 3 departments, the Accountant-General's Department (AGD), VITAL, and Singapore Customs.

Statutory Boards

Accounting and Corporate Regulatory Authority 
Inland Revenue Authority of Singapore 
 Singapore Accountancy Commission 
 Tote Board

Ministers
The Ministry is headed by the Minister for Finance, who is appointed as part of the Cabinet of Singapore. The incumbent minister is Deputy Prime Minister Lawrence Wong from the People's Action Party.

Interim ministers

References

External links 
 

Finance
Singapore
1959 establishments in Singapore
Singapore